The men's 400 metre freestyle at the 2005 World Aquatics Championships took place on 24 July (heats and final) in the Olympic pool at Parc Jean-Drapeau in Montreal, Canada. 57 swimmers were entered and in the event in the preliminary heats, the top-8 of which advanced on to swim again in the final heat that event.

The existing records at the start of the event were:
World record (WR): 3:40.08, Ian Thorpe (Australia), 30 July 2002 in Manchester, UK.
Championship record (CR): 3:40.17, Ian Thorpe (Australia), Fukuoka 2001 (22 July 2001)

Results

Final

Prelims

See also
Swimming at the 2003 World Aquatics Championships – Men's 400 metre freestyle
Swimming at the 2004 Summer Olympics – Men's 400 metre freestyle
Swimming at the 2007 World Aquatics Championships – Men's 400 metre freestyle

References

FINA Worlds 2005: Men's 400 Freestyle heats results from OmegaTiming.com (official timer of the 2005 Worlds). Published 2005-07-30, retrieved 2009-08-21.
FINA Worlds 2005: Men's 400 Freestyle final results from OmegaTiming.com (official timer of the 2005 Worlds). Published 2005-07-30, retrieved 2009-08-21.

Swimming at the 2005 World Aquatics Championships